Sudasinghe Mudiyanselage Peshala Jayarathne Bandara is a Sri Lankan politician and is the former Chief Minister of the North Central Province of Sri Lanka.

References

Sinhalese politicians
Sri Lankan Buddhists
Chief Ministers of North Central Province, Sri Lanka
Living people
Year of birth missing (living people)